The 2013 European Mountain Running Championships were held on 6 July at Borovets in Sofia, Bulgaria. The competition featured four individual races: The men's race was 11.8 km long and with an ascent of 1152 m, the women's and junior men's races were 8.8 km long with an ascent of 1072 m. and the junior women's race was 3.5 km long with an ascent of 530 m.

In the men's race, Bernard Dematteis ended Ahmet Arslan's six year winning streak by finishing first, over a minute ahead of Alex Baldaccini who finished second and Arslan who finished third. In the women's race, Andrea Mayr won her second title, beating Valentina Belotti and Mateja Kosovelj by 1 minute 5 seconds and 1 minute 18 seconds respectively. In total 217 athletes from 27 countries participated.

Results

Men

Women

References

European Mountain Running Championships
European Mountain Running Championships
European Mountain Running Championships
International athletics competitions hosted by Bulgaria
Sport in Sofia
European Mountain Running Championships